Elytroleptus metallicus is a species of beetle in the family Cerambycidae. It was described by Nonfried in 1894.

References

Elytroleptus
Beetles described in 1894